{{Infobox film
| name           = Curious George
| image          = 
| caption  = Official franchise logo
| director       = 
| producer       = 
| writer         = 
| based_on       = 
| starring       = 
| music          = {{Plainlist|
Heitor Pereira (1–3)
Jack Johnson (1)
Carbon Leaf (2)
Germaine Franco (4–5")
Dara Taylor ("6")
}}
| studio         = 
| distributor    = 
| released       = 2006–present
| country        = United States
| language       = English
| budget         = $50 million
| gross          = $72.1 million
}}Curious George is an American media franchise based on the book series of the same name by H. A. Rey and Margret Rey. The series began with the 2006 theatrical release of Curious George. The film's success led it to receiving direct-to-video sequels, a television series (which aired three specials during its run) as well as a video game.

Films
 Curious George (2006) Curious George is the first film in the Curious George series. In an attempt to save a Museum, a museum director named Ted goes to Africa to find a forty-foot idol, while encountering a monkey named George. It was released in theaters on February 10, 2006.

Curious George 2: Follow That Monkey! (2010)Curious George 2: Follow That Monkey! is the second film in the Curious George series. It follows George and Ted embark on a cross-country trip to reunite a baby elephant named Kayla with her family. It was released on DVD on March 2, 2010.

Curious George 3: Back to the Jungle (2015)Curious George 3: Back to the Jungle is the third film in the Curious George series. In the film, George is asked to take part in a special mission to space, but a mishap during the journey lands him back to the jungle where he originally came from. It was released on DVD on June 23, 2015.

Curious George 4: Royal Monkey (2019)Curious George: Royal Monkey is the fourth film in the Curious George series. It focuses on George as he gets mixed up with a royal monkey named Phillippe. It was released on DVD on September 10, 2019.

Curious George 5: Go West Go Wild (2020)Curious George: Go West Go Wild is the fifth film in the Curious George series. The film features George and Ted traveling to Cousin Ginny's farm for a relaxing vacation, but their fun is cut short when a herd of animals escape and run loose. It was released exclusively on Peacock on September 8, 2020. The film was released via digital and DVD on December 15, 2020. 

Curious George 6: Cape Ahoy (2021)Curious George: Cape Ahoy'' is the sixth film in the franchise. George and Ted go on vacation to the town of Coddington with a small house owned by a treasure lover, Captain Elmer to find ancient treasure buried somewhere in his land or the beaches along with a baby seal making his way into the adventure with an endangered seal mom. There is also the legend of Captain TrumpetTooter and his abandoned, still intact, pirate ship as well as Getrude St. John, a Captain TrumpetTooter legend loving scientist and Emma, the niece of Captain Elmer who is an animal rescue scientist and would do anything to rescue the animals, including seals. It was released on Peacock on September 30, 2021.

Television series

Curious George (2006–present)

The series explores themes of learning, forgiveness and playful curiosity, and follows George, who is a sweet but trouble making African monkey. It premiered on September 4, 2006.

Reception

Box office performance

Critical and public response

Cast and characters

Crew

Other media

Video games

References

Film franchises introduced in 2006
Curious George
Animated film series
Film franchises
Universal Pictures franchises
Children's film series